Barca bicolor is a species of skipper in the family Hesperiidae and is found in Tibet and Yunnan.

References

External links
Natural History Museum Lepidoptera genus database

Butterflies described in 1896
Hesperiidae
Butterflies of Asia